John Taylor More was an American politician in the Catskill region of the state of New York. He served in several political capacities in the Township of Roxbury, NY and in the State of New York.

Early life
John Taylor More was born on February 27, 1771, in Rothiemurchus, Inverness Shire, Scotland to John More and Betty Taylor More. When still young his family, consisting of him, his parents, and his brother Robert, moved to the United States. They first settled near Harpersfield, New York, but were driven back out by the Native Americans. They resided in Catskill, New York, for several years.

Several years later the family had grown by a considerable amount and they decided to try to resettle their claim in Harpersfield in 1786. They ended up trading claims with another man and gained claim to what is now Grand Gorge, New York.

After settling their claim, More's father attracted more settlers to the area and within several years the town of Moresville, named after the family and now known as Grand Gorge, was well underway.

Political career
In 1807, More he was elected as a member of the New York State Assembly. He was reelected to the assembly in 1808, 1810, and in 1814.

In 1819, he was nominated to, and ran for a position in the New York State Senate. He was elected and served in that capacity for four years.

More was not only involved in state politics, he also took an interest in matters closer to home. He was elected to the position of Town Supervisor of the Township of Roxbury (which Moresville lies within) in 1826, 1827, and in 1830. He was the first town clerk, occupying the post until 1809. He was also the postmaster for Moresville for twenty years following the death of his father.

Personal life
After his family had settled the Moresville claim, More began courting Eleanor Laraway of Schohariekill (now Prattsville, NY). They were married on December 16, 1792, and had a total of twelve children, two of which died while in infancy.

More raised his family in Moresville where he operated a hotel and a large farm adjacent to it.

More was also very active in the Presbyterian Church in the town of Moresville (within the township of Roxbury, NY).

References

External links
 

1771 births
1857 deaths
Catskills
Members of the New York State Assembly
New York (state) state senators
New York (state) Whigs
19th-century American politicians
New York (state) postmasters
People from Roxbury, New York
Scottish emigrants to the United States